Chalkwell is an electoral ward of Southend-on-Sea covering Chalkwell. It is represented by three local government councillors, each elected to serve a four-year term.

Councillors

 Indicates Councillor elected that year.

Elections

2019 Southend Local Elections:Chalkwell

Green candidate compared to 2016 election

2018 Southend Local Elections:Chalkwell

2016 Southend Local Elections:Chalkwell

UKIP candidate compared to 2014 election

References

Electoral wards of Southend-on-Sea